Oorgu is a village in Viljandi Parish, Viljandi County in Estonia.

References

Villages in Viljandi County